Shadeene "Shay" Evans (born 7 September 2001) is an Australian soccer player. She currently plays forSydney FC and for the Australia women's national under-20 soccer team.

Early life 
Born and raised in Borroloola, Northern Territory, Australia, Evans was introduced to soccer at age nine, by the JMF program run by John Kundereri Moriarty the first Indigenous footballer to be selected for Australia. Her first coach was inaugural program director  Daniel Campos, a former goalkeeper who began the program in 2012. After much learning, training under the program with various coaches her game needed further development thus in 2014, Moriarty picked Evans as a maiden program candidate for a school sports scholarship. Prior to this, along with other Indigenous youth, she was part of a select group from Borroloola to visit Brazil and experience the 2014 FIFA World Cup.

In August 2015, Evans moved to New South Wales where she attended Westfields Sports High School located 3,000 kilometers from Borroloola. "I miss family, going out bush and hunting and camping. It's bush, scrub and rivers, and we sleep outside with tents and a fire. It's really small, a really remote community, and there's not many people. But there's a lot of soccer," she says. She was coached by Alen Stajcic, the head coach of the Australia women's national soccer team. In addition to training at school, she also became a part of the NSW Institute of Sport.

Club career
In November 2018, Evans signed with Sydney FC ahead of the 2018-19 W-League season. She made her debut for the club during a 3–0 win against the Western Sydney Wanderers on 10 January 2019.

On 17 November 2019, Evans scored her first senior goal for Sydney FC in a 3–0 win over Melbourne Victory in Round 1 of the 2019–20 W-League season.

After the W-League season, Evans returned to the NPL, and played 5 matches for Sydney Olympic. The next season she joined Northern Tigers.

Ahead of the 2021–22 A-League Women season, Evans returned to the top Australian league, joining Adelaide United. In October 2022, she returned to Sydney FC.

International career
In March 2018, Evans was named to the Young Matildas along with ten other footballers from the NSW Institute of Sport, for a week-long training camp preceding a match against Thailand.

References

External links
 

Australian women's soccer players
Sportswomen from the Northern Territory
21st-century Australian women
21st-century Australian people
Living people
Women's association football forwards
Sydney FC (A-League Women) players
Adelaide United FC (A-League Women) players
2001 births